Zhaoyuan may refer to two county-level divisions of the People's Republic of China:

Zhaoyuan, Shandong (招远市), county-level city of Yantai, Shandong
Zhaoyuan County (肇源县), of Daqing, Heilongjiang